In the French Wars of Religion, the Day of the Barricades (in ), 12 May 1588, was an outwardly spontaneous public uprising in staunchly Catholic Paris against the moderate, hesitant, temporizing policies of Henry III. It was in fact called forth by the "Council of Sixteen", representing the sixteen quartiers of Paris, led by Henri, duc de Guise, head of the Catholic League, and coordinated in detail by Philip II of Spain's ambassador, Bernardino de Mendoza.

Background
Despite a royal interdict, the duc de Guise had returned to Paris in the wake of a betrayed conspiracy that had been set for 24 April, for he could not afford to be seen to desert his followers. In response the king, housed in the Palais du Louvre,  mustered in the capital several regiments of Swiss Guards and the Gardes Françaises, an act that violated a privilege of the city of Paris, not to have foreign troops quartered in the city. Rumors were spread that the heads of the Catholic party of the House of Guise were to be arrested. The king ordered a census to be taken of Paris, a move that would flush out any "strangers", or non-Parisians, in the city, including forces of the duc de Guise, for the census ordered for 12 May was to be a very exact search of houses, with lists of people, arms and horses.

Barricades 
The barricades of wagons, timbers and hogsheads (barriques) blocked access at major points in the city, beginning early in the day in the university quarter, where a certain Crucé, leader of the Seize, coordinated efforts. The barricades so hastily erected in the streets from materials at hand were the first appearance of that staple of French revolutions.  The militia formed the backbone of the revolt; the royal troops were immobilised in the various quartiers. The duc de Guise accepted an urgent message from the King to permit the orderly withdrawal of the foreign troops: "by consenting to rescue the royal forces, at the same time as claiming to save the city, he was able to project an image of his innocence and virtue, while actually delivering a fatal blow to the king's authority."

Royal forces
The royal forces withdrew to the Louvre, as all the gates of Paris were closed save the Porte Saint-Honoré. The following day, 13 May 1588, the king was prevented from going to the Sainte-Chapelle, but the Porte Neuve, between the Louvre and the Tuileries, was left unguarded. An urgent message from the hôtel de Guise, whether betraying the unclear purposes of Guise or following his interest in not being seen to harm the king, convinced Henri to flee to Chartres. By day's end some sixty soldiers had been killed in sporadic violence, the Bastille had capitulated and the duc de Guise was in undisputed possession of Paris, where he was offered the crown but refused it.

Timing 
The timing of the tumult was not as well coordinated with the sailing of the Spanish Armada against England as the Spanish ambassador, Mendoza, had planned, but it still effectively distracted any Huguenot interference. The staunchly Catholic populace of Paris harbored genuine animosity towards king Henri III for several reasons. First, his unacceptable mignons and his fashionable court were perceived as effete and disengaged. Second, they were seen as all too ready to come to terms with the Protestants and the heir presumptive to the French throne, Henri of Navarre, who had not yet been formally designated heir to the childless Henri III. Finally, the Parisians were alarmed due to the troops posted in the city. Thus, the emotions were easy to exploit.

From his strong position, Guise forced the King to sign at Rouen the Édit d'union, registered at Paris 21 July. By its terms the King promised never to conclude a truce or peace with the "hérétiques", to forbid public office to any who would not take a public oath of their Catholicité and never to leave the throne to a prince who was not Catholic; secret clauses extended amnesty to all deeds of the Catholic League, accorded support to its troops and made over to the League additional fortified places de sécurité. Two weeks later the duc de Guise was named lieutenant général of the kingdom. However, on 23 December of that year, the duc de Guise was assassinated in Blois by the bodyguards of the king; de Guise's brother, Louis II de Lorraine, was assassinated the following day.

Pierre Matthieu recalled the events of the Journée des barricades in his La Guisiade (1589).

Notes

References

Further reading
 Carroll, Stuart. (2000) French Historical Studies. The Revolt of Paris, 1588: Aristocratic Insurgency and the Mobilization of Popular Support. 23(2):301–337; .
 Mattingly, Garrett The Armada'', includes an account of the Day of the Barricades

1588 in France
16th century in Paris
French Wars of Religion
Henry III of France
Insurgencies in Paris